Northesk is a civil parish in Northumberland County, New Brunswick, Canada.

For governance purposes it is divided between the city of Miramichi; the Indian reserves of Big Hole Tract 8 (North Half), Big Hole Tract 8 (South Half), Eel Ground 2, Indian Point 1, Red Bank 4, and Red Bank 7; the incorporated rural community of Miramichi River Valley, and the Greater Miramichi rural district. The city, rural community, and rural district are all members of the Greater Miramichi Regional Service Commission.

Prior to the 2023 governance reform, the parish was divided between Miramichi, the various Indian reserves, and local service districts of Sunny Corner and the parish of North Esk, which included an area along Route 430 that is now part of Miramichi.

Origin of name
The parish was named in honour of the Earl of Northesk, third in command at the Battle of Trafalgar. Six of the parishes erected simultaneously in Northumberland County in 1814 were named for prominent British military figures.

History
Northesk was erected in 1814 from part of Newcastle Parish and unassigned territory to the west and north. It contained part of Newcastle Parish until 1824, and most of Southesk Parish along with parts of Derby until 1879.

Boundaries
Northesk Parish is bounded:

 on the north by the Gloucester County line;
 on the east by a line beginning on the Gloucester County line about 10.2 kilometres westerly of the Canadian National Railway line, then running south to the southeastern corner of a grant to Oliver Willard on the western side of Jones Cove;
 on the south, beginning at Jones Cove and running up the Northwest Miramichi River to the mouth of the Little Southwest Miramichi River, then running north 45º west to the Victoria County line at a point about 150 metres south-southeast of Route 385;
 on the west by the Victoria County line.

Evolution of boundaries
When Northesk was erected it had fairly similar boundaries to the combination of modern Northesk and Southesk Parish, although it contained part of the former town of Newcastle, from about the intersection of Newcastle Boulevard and Beaverbrook to Jones Cove; a triangle in its northeastern corner was part of Newcastle Parish.

In 1824 the boundary with Newcastle was moved to Jones Cove and ran more northerly, losing a triangle of land in the south but gaining a triangle of territory from Newcastle.

In 1830 the southern boundary west of Nelson Parish was moved north, removing a strip of territory with the modern Route 108 running through it. The lost area was transferred to Blackville, Blissfield, and Ludlow Parishes.

In 1850 the southern boundary with Nelson Parish was moved north, placing part of Warwick Settlement in Nelson. The boundary was moved back to its original location in 1856.

In 1879 the territory south of the Northwest Miramichi River and a line running northwest from the mouth of the Little Southwest Miramichi River was erected as Southesk Parish. This gave Northesk its modern boundaries.

Communities
Communities at least partly within the parish. bold indicates an incorporated municipality or Indian reserve; italics indicates a name no longer in official use

  Big Hole
  Big Hole Tract 8 (North Half)
  Big Hole Tract 8 (South Half)
 Boom Road
 Chaplin Island Road
 Curtis Settlement
 Curventon
  Eel Ground 2
  Eel Ground
 Exmoor
 Indian Falls Depot
  Indian Point 1
 Lumsden Road
 Maple Glen
  Miramichi
 North Esk Boom
 Popple Depot
  Red Bank 7
  Sevogle
  Strathadam
  Sunny Corner
 Trout Brook
  Wayerton
 Whitney

Bodies of water
Bodies of water at least partly within the parish.

 Big Sevogle River
 Little River
 Little Sevogle River
 Little Southwest Miramichi River
 The Oxbow
 Mamozekel River
 Nepisiguit River
 Devils Elbow
 Moose Bogan
 Nepisiguit Deadwater
 Northwest Miramichi River
 Portage River
 Tomogonops River
 Clearwater Stream
 Little Millstream
 Mullin Stream
 Northwest Millstream
 Hawgee Creek
 Indiantown Creek
 Castor Bogan
 Packsack Lake
 Sole Leather Lake
 more than fifty other officially named lakes

Islands
Islands at least partly within the parish.

 Chaplin Island
 Copps Island
 Exmoor Island
 McHughs Island
 McLaughlin Island
 McNeill Island
 Oldfields Island
 Patsys Island
 Quigley Island
 Shaddick Island
 Three Islands
 Tozers Island

Other notable places
Parks, historic sites, and other noteworthy places at least partly within the parish.
 Bellefond Protected Natural Area
 Big Bald Mountain Protected Natural Area
 Consolidated Mining and Smelting
 East Branch Portage River Protected Natural Area
 Freeze Lakes Protected Natural Area
 Heath Steele Mines
 Mount Carleton Provincial Park
 Mount Carleton Wildlife Management Area
 Mount Denys Protected Natural Area
 Mount Elizabeth Protected Natural Area
 Nepisiguit Protected Natural Area
 Sevogle Airport
 South Branch Big Sevogle River Protected Natural Area
 Stony Brook Protected Natural Area

Demographics
Parish population total does not include Indian reserves and portion within Miramichi

Population
Population trend

Language
Mother tongue (2016)

See also
List of parishes in New Brunswick

Notes

References

Parishes of Northumberland County, New Brunswick
Local service districts of Northumberland County, New Brunswick